Protein Expression and Purification is a peer-reviewed scientific journal covering biotechnological research on protein production and isolation based on conventional fractionation as well as techniques employing various molecular biological procedures to increase protein expression.

Abstracting and indexing 
The journal is abstracted and indexed in Biological Abstracts, Chemical Abstracts, Current Contents/Life Sciences, EMBiology, Food Science and Technology Abstracts, MEDLINE, Science Citation Index and Scopus.

See also 
Protein production
Protein purification

External links 

 

Elsevier academic journals
Biotechnology journals
English-language journals
Publications established in 1990
Monthly journals